Pink Pineapple is an anime production company that specializes in the production of hentai OVAs. It was founded by KSS and is currently owned by Softgarage.

List of video titles by Pink Pineapple

A Girl in a Lower Grade (Kakyuusei) 
A 13 episode TV series based on the ELF Corporation renai eroge Kakyusei, part of the Nanpa/Dokyusei series. 
Alien from the Darkness
A 1 episode OVA series
Angel of Darkness
A 4 movie OVA series
Angels In the Court 
A set 2 of OVA series, each comprising 2 OVA episodes. The OVA series is based on an eroge series of the same name
Anejiru The Animation 
A 2 episode OVA series
Beat Angel Escalayer 
A 3 episode OVA series based on the eponymous eroge
Buttobi CPU (I Dream of Mimi) 
A 3 episode OVA series, an ecchi satire of the battle between the NEC PC98 and Apple Macintosh for market dominance in the Japanese home PC market
Classmates 2 Special: Graduation (Doukyuusei 2 SPECIAL) 
A 3 episode OVA series based on the ELF Corporation renai eroge Dokyusei 2.
Dragon Knight: The Wheel of Time 
A 3 episode OVA series based on the ELF Corporation eroge RPG Dragon Knight 4
Elven Bride
A 2 episode OVA series
 End of Summer
A set of OVA series based on the ELF Corporation eroge renai game Dokyusei
End of Summer 1 (Dōkyūsei) 
A 4 episode OVA series
End of Summer 2 (Dōkyūsei 2) 
A 12 episode OVA series
F³ (Frantic, Frustrated, and Female) 
A 3 episode OVA series
Hatsu Inu - Strange Kind of Woman - THE ANIMATION
A 2 episode OVA series
Heisei Harenchi Gakuen
A 1 episode OVA series
Kakyusei series
A set of OVA series based on the ELF Corporation renai eroge dating sim Kakyusei, part of the Dokyusei series of games
Mizuiro 
A 2 episode OVA series
Moonlight Lady 
A 5 episode OVA series
New Angel 
A 5 episode OVA series based on the hentai manga by U-jin
Parade Parade 
A 2 episode OVA series based on the adult manga by Satoshi Akifuji
Refrain Blue 
A 3 episode OVA series
Rei Rei - Missionary of Love 
A 2 episode OVA series
Tournament of the Gods 
A 3 episode OVA series
Usagi-chan de Cue
Welcome to Pia Carrot series,
A set of OVA series based on the series of eroge renai games of the same name, also called Pia Carrot He Youkoso!!
Yu-No 
A 4 episode OVA series based on the eponymous eroge

See also
Green Bunny

References

External links
Pink Pineapple official website
Pin Pai Juicy

Anime companies
Hentai companies